Nina Koshetz (née Poray-Koshetz (:uk:Порай-Кошиці); 30 December 1891 – 14 May 1965) was a Russian-Ukrainian, later American opera soprano, recital singer and actress, and the niece of Alexander Koshetz.

Early life and career

Nina Koshetz was born in Kyiv, then moved to Moscow and became an opera singer. Her father, opera singer Pavel Koshetz (ru: Павел Алексеевич Кошиц; 1863 - 2 March 1904), committed suicide in 1904, when Nina was 12 years old. From 1908–13 she studied in Moscow State Conservatory with Konstantin Igumnov and Sergei Taneyev, among others.

Having received voice lessons in France from the retired dramatic soprano Felia Litvinne, she sang leading roles in opera and performed in principal opera houses across Russia and Europe. In the late 1910s she performed at the Petrograd Conservatory and was accompanied by then-unknown Vladimir Horowitz. She had initially resisted being accompanied by the unknown student, but afterward insisted only he could accompany her there; she subsequently programmed some of Horowitz's songs.

In 1920 Koshetz joined Ukrainian Republic Capella co-founded and led by her uncle Oleksandr Koshyts on their European Tour. After which she emigrated to the US and joined the Chicago Opera Association where she sang in the premiere of Prokofiev's The Love for Three Oranges (1921). 

Nina Koshetz later performed for the Russian Opera Company in New York City and on tour in South America. At the end of the 1920s she was active in France, where she appeared in the French premiere of Sadko. Known for her overly-extravagant life style, her vocal powers declined in the 1930s and in 1940 she retired to Hollywood where she made a living as a voice teacher and restaurateur (a venture that ended in bankruptcy in 1942). She appeared in bit parts in several Hollywood movies. She died in Santa Ana, California in 1965. 

Nina's daughter Marina Koshetz (also known as Marina Schubert;  1912–2001) was an operatic soprano.

Relationship with Rachmaninoff
She had a working relationship with composer Sergei Rachmaninoff during the 1910s, and he composed a cycle of six romantic songs dedicated to her (opus 38).

Recordings
The Nina Koshetz Edition - 1916-1941
Songs by Mussorgsky, Tchaikovsky, Rimsky-Korsakov, Gretchaninov, Varlamov, Rachmaninoff, Anton Arensky, Martini, Ponce, Ravel, and Chopin etc.; arias from Sadko, The Demon, Dobrynia Nikititch, The Fair at Sorochyntsi, Pique Dame and Prince Igor. CD released 1993 (Opal/Pavilion Records, 9855)

Nina Koshetz – Complete Victor and Schirmer recordings 1928/29 and 1940 (and Odarka Trifonieva Sprishevskaya – Victor recordings)
Songs and arias by Borodin, Rimsky-Korsakov, Ravel, Ponce, Martini, Chopin, Gretchaninov, Rachmaninoff, Arensky, Tchaikovsky. (Nimbus Prima Voce CD NI 7935-36)

Film roles
She appeared as "Countess Vorontsov" opposite Ivan Mozzhukhin in the silent film The Loves of Casanova (1927), and as "Fatme" in Secrets of the Orient (1928). After her retirement from the operatic and concert stage, she appeared in bit parts in talkie films such as Algiers (1938), The Chase (1946), Captain Pirate (1952), and Hot Blood (1956).

Further reading
Scott, M (1979), The Record of Singing II, pp 23–25 
Scott, M (2008), "Rachmaninoff" (The History Press. Gloucester, 2008.) pp 109–110; 
Steane, J B (1992), 'Koshetz, Nina' in The New Grove Dictionary of Opera, ed. Stanley Sadie (London);

References

External links

Musicweb review of Koshetz recordings released by Nimbus Records
Biographical page on Cantabile-Subito website
 Nina Koshetz with her daughter Marina at Getty Images

1891 births
1965 deaths
Burials at Forest Lawn Memorial Park (Glendale)
20th-century Russian women opera singers
Sopranos from the Russian Empire
White Russian emigrants to the United States
20th-century American women opera singers
Musicians from Kyiv